"Der Hohenfriedberger" (AM I, 21 (Army March I, 1c and Army march III, 1b)), also called "Hohenfriedberger Marsch" or "Der Hohenfriedberger Marsch", is one of the most classic and well known German military marches. It takes its name from the victory of the Prussians over the allied Austrians and Saxons on 4 June 1745 during the Second Silesian War at the Battle of Hohenfriedberg, near Striegau.

History

There are many legends surrounding the origins of the march. Supposedly, the Bayreuther dragoon regiment, which was crucial in securing a Prussian victory, reported to its quarters the day after the battle while the march was played. Whether the march was actually played then is just as questionable as the claim that Frederick II of Prussia was the composer of the piece. (The melody appears to be largely derived from The Pappenheimer March, which dates from the early-17th century.) It is understood that the king issued to the Bayreuther dragoon regiment a Gnadenbrief, or "letter of grace", that authorized it to play both grenadier marches of the foot soldiers (with flutes and drums) and the cuirassier marches of the cavalry (with kettledrums and trumpet fanfare).

The lyrics were certainly composed later; at the time of the victory of Hohenfriedberg, these Dragoons did not yet bear the title "Ansbach-Bayreuth".

The first outline (piano rendition) was written in 1795. For the first time in 1845, in celebration of the hundredth anniversary of the battle, the march was given lyrics, "Auf, Ansbach-Dragoner! Auf, Ansbach-Bayreuth!...." because the regiment by then had been renamed "Ansbach-Bayreuth". In the time of the German Kaiser the title "Hohenfriedberger" was symbolic both on the basis of its connection with the great military victories of Friedrich II and because of the authorship of the House of Hohenzollern.

In the year 1866, in commemoration of the victories of Friedrich II against the Austrians, Johann Gottfried Piefke added Der Hohenfriedberger as a trio to his "Königgrätzer Marsch" written after the victorious Battle of Königgrätz.

Lyrics

See also
Königgrätzer Marsch
Yorckscher Marsch
Badonviller Marsch
Old Comrades

References

German military marches